West Union Street Historic District is a national historic district located at Morganton, Burke County, North Carolina.  It encompasses 59 contributing buildings in a predominantly upper class residential section of Morganton.  They were built between about 1815 and 1940, with the majority built between about 1890 and 1938.  The district includes representative examples of Queen Anne, Colonial Revival, Bungalow / American Craftsman, and Late Victorian style architecture.  Located in the district and listed separately is the Franklin Pierce Tate House.

It was listed on the National Register of Historic Places in 1987.

References

Houses on the National Register of Historic Places in North Carolina
Historic districts on the National Register of Historic Places in North Carolina
Victorian architecture in North Carolina
Colonial Revival architecture in North Carolina
Queen Anne architecture in North Carolina
Historic districts in Burke County, North Carolina
National Register of Historic Places in Burke County, North Carolina
Houses in Burke County, North Carolina